Shirley Run is a  long 3rd order tributary to Thompson Creek in Crawford County, Pennsylvania.

Course
Shirley Run rises about 2 miles northeast of Vrooman, Pennsylvania, in Blue Swamp at the Warren County line and then flows south-southwest to join Thompson Creek at Shelmandine Springs.

Watershed
Shirley Run drains  of area, receives about 45.6 in/year of precipitation, has a wetness index of 450.87, and is about 52% forested.

See also
 List of rivers of Pennsylvania

References

Rivers of Pennsylvania
Rivers of Crawford County, Pennsylvania
Rivers of Warren County, Pennsylvania